Serena is a 2014 drama film based on the 2008 novel of the same name by American author Ron Rash. Directed by Susanne Bier, the film stars Jennifer Lawrence and Bradley Cooper as newlyweds running a timber business in 1930s North Carolina.

Plot
In Depression-era North Carolina, George Pemberton (Bradley Cooper) is an ambitious timber baron who falls in love with Serena Shaw (Jennifer Lawrence), a young woman with a sad past. They marry, and Serena joins George on his land and starts to take control, pressuring and questioning George while remaining affectionate.

George's business partner Buchanan feels threatened as Serena begins to undermine his authority. The partnership worsens, and Buchanan strikes a deal with the local sheriff, who wants to buy George's land to make a park. George is hurt by Buchanan's betrayal, and Serena convinces him Buchanan was never his friend.

On a shooting trip, George and Buchanan go alone to flush out a bear. George contemplates killing Buchanan, only to hesitate and be seen by Buchanan. As Buchanan cocks his rifle, George fires first and kills him. Campbell, George's worker, witnesses the murder but denies it to Sheriff McDowell, and the death is ruled an accident. Serena consoles George and justifies his actions.

After seeing his illegitimate son Jacob posing with his mother, Rachel, for a picture, George feels responsible for the boy and begins giving Rachel money. Serena remains unaware of this, but considers Rachel and the baby a threat.

When Galloway loses his hand to an errant axe swing, Serena uses a belt as a tourniquet to save his life. George rushes the pregnant Serena to the hospital after she experiences heavy bleeding and pain. She miscarries, and they learn she can never again bear children. Tensions grow, and the parentage of Rachel's baby becomes more obvious to Serena.

While Serena and George are away, Campbell finds ledgers in the safe and presents them to the Sheriff, preparing to testify that George has been bribing a senator and shot Buchanan deliberately. Discovering Campbell has taken the ledgers, George and Serena realize he could ruin them.

Galloway tells Serena that he knows where Campbell is, and tells George that he knows where a panther is, prompting George to go into the forest to hunt it as Galloway heads into town to find Campbell, kill him, and retrieve the ledgers. Finding George’s hidden picture of Rachel and her baby and discovering that George has been giving Rachel money, Serena scratches the baby's face from the photograph.

Serena leaves with Galloway, telling George that she has business to take care of. Not finding Rachel at home, they head for the Widow Jenkins’ house. George's employee Vaughn calls the Sheriff, worried about Rachel and what Serena plans to do. The Sheriff goes to Widow Jenkins’ house, finding her with her throat slashed, and takes Rachel and her baby away.

In the morning, the Sheriff questions George, revealing that Galloway killed Campbell and the Widow Jenkins and that Galloway is after Rachel and her child. George asks Serena if she sent Galloway to kill Rachel and Jacob, which she assures him had to be done. George storms out and, when Serena follows him, he chokes and then releases her before driving off with a gun and the ledgers.

George goes to the Sheriff, gives him the ledgers, and promises to turn himself in if the Sheriff tells him where Rachel and the baby are. George races to save Rachel before Galloway finds her. Galloway tracks Rachel to the train station, where she hides in a shed. As the train approaches, George finds Galloway, who sees Rachel jump onto the train. George goes after them and slashes Galloway's throat.

George bids Rachel and the baby farewell as they depart to live with Vaughn. George returns to the camp and sets off to hunt the panther. He shoots it, but the panther leaps at him from behind, fatally wounding him. He manages to kill it with a hunting knife before dying.

The Sheriff returns to the Pemberton cabin with George's body. Serena, having expected George to return, grows upset and does not go to identify his body. As the Sheriff leaves, Serena lies on the bed and uses a lighter to set the cabin on fire. She remains motionless as it burns, killing her.

Cast

 Bradley Cooper as George Pemberton
 Jennifer Lawrence as Serena Pemberton (née Shaw)
 Rhys Ifans as Galloway
 Sean Harris as Campbell
 Toby Jones as Sheriff McDowell
 Sam Reid as Joe Vaughn
 David Dencik as Mr. Buchanan
 Conleth Hill as Dr. Chaney
 Blake Ritson as Lowenstein
 Ned Dennehy as Ledbetter
 Charity Wakefield as Agatha
 Michael Ryan as Coldfield
 Kim Bodnia as Abe Hermann
 Ana Ularu as Rachel Hermann
 Bodil Jørgensen as Mrs. Sloan
 Douglas Hodge as Horace Kephart

Production
The film was originally to be directed by Darren Aronofsky, with Angelina Jolie as the title character. Susanne Bier replaced Aronofsky as director and Lawrence was hired. Lawrence recommended Bradley Cooper, with whom she had worked previously on Silver Linings Playbook; they had gotten along so well that they often spoke about working together in the future. When Lawrence read the script for Serena, she sent a copy to Cooper and asked if he would do it with her. He agreed and Bier cast him as George Pemberton.

At the time, this was the third project to star Cooper and Lawrence, after Silver Linings Playbook and American Hustle, and their second time playing mutual love interests.

Filming took place in the Czech Republic at Barrandov Studios from March 26 to May 2012. Bier took more than eighteen months to complete the film, but there were no re-shoots or problems in post-production. Bier also had to take time away to promote Love Is All You Need.

Release
The film premiered at the BFI London Film Festival on October 13, 2014, was released in the United Kingdom on October 24, 2014, and France on November 12, 2014. Magnolia Pictures distributed the film in the United States. The film was released on all video on demand and digital stores on February 26, 2015, before a limited theatrical run on March 27, 2015.

Reception

Box office
The film earned £95,000 ($153,310) on its opening weekend in the United Kingdom, debuting at No. 19 at the UK box office. In its second week, the film dropped to finish 34th, grossing £11,645 from 37 screens. The movie ended its run with a total gross of $320,907 (£200,557)

The film made $1 million on video on demand in the United States before its theatrical release. The movie opened in 59 screens across the United States on March 20, 2015, and earned $100,090 for a 30th-place finish.

As of November 9, 2014, the film had a theatrical domestic gross of $100,090 and an international theatrical gross of $3,723,317 for a worldwide total of $3,823,407.

Critical response
Serena received negative reviews from critics. On Rotten Tomatoes, the film has a score of 16% based on 110 reviews with an average rating of 4.28/10. The website's critical consensus states "Serena unites an impressive array of talent on either side of the cameras – then leaves viewers to wonder how it all went so wrong." On Metacritic the film has a score of 36 out of 100 based on reviews from 29 critics, indicating "generally unfavorable reviews".

Andy Lea of Daily Star  wrote in a positive review that, "It's another terrific performance from Lawrence, who almost manages to sell Serena's all too quick transformation from steely feminist to crazed femme fatale." Similarly, Peter Bradshaw of The Guardian praised Lawrence, "Lawrence brings her A-game. She is passionate, impetuous and confident, with a tough determination to grab the brass ring that has been presented to her." Guy Lodge of Variety agreed,  "The Stanwyck comparisons lavished upon Lawrence's Oscar-winning work in Silver Linings Playbook resurface here; she certainly looks every inch the Golden Age siren with her crimped vanilla locks and array of creamy silken sheaths that, true to vintage Hollywood form, never seem to get sullied in the wild." He added, "The star also makes good on her proven chemistry with Cooper, who acquits himself with stoic intelligence and a variable regional accent in an inscrutable role that, for its occasional flourishes of Clark Gable bravado, is equal parts hero, anti-hero and patsy."

In The Canberra Times, Jake Wilson praised Cooper, arguing, "Cooper once again proves his value as a leading man who approaches his roles like a character actor." However, he was more nuanced about the cinematography, suggesting it made "the setting slightly abstract, in the manner of her former mentor Lars von Trier – and the storytelling suffers from some sudden transitions and ill-explained twists." He concluded, "if this is not a perfect film, it's an unusually haunting one."

Writing for the Toronto Star, Peter Howell criticized the film, suggesting the cinematography was "bland, unsteady and lacking in definition." In the Vancouver Sun, Katherine Monk argued that Bier was "probably trying to make a movie similar in feel to The Piano." However, she argued that the "whole national park subplot is confusing and blurs the blacks and whites required to generate sympathy, and every character suffers a similarly grey fate." She concluded, "by the end, we barely like anyone in this smoky landscape, let alone care about what happens to them." Writing for The Toronto Sun, Bruce Kirland stressed the setting of the Great Depression, suggesting it was, "the rural reflection of the film versions of The Great Gatsby, which are based on the classic 1925 novel by F. Scott Fitzgerald." Nevertheless, he called the film a "colossal bore."

In The Daily Telegraph, Robbie Collin praised Lawrence's acting at the expense of Cooper's, suggesting, "Lawrence comes out of it significantly better than Cooper," adding that she was "effectively Lady Macbeth in jodhpurs and a pussy-bow blouse." He concluded on a despondent note, writing "all [the film] amounts to is dead wood." Stephen Dalton of The Hollywood Reporter criticised the film, arguing, "it is difficult to believe a single word of it, still less to care about these relentlessly selfish and short-sighted characters." Dalton praised Lawrence's and Cooper's acting, but suggested the problem lay in "Christopher Kyle's script, a string of jarring cliches and clunky attempts at subtext" and "Johan Soderqvist's cloying, imploring orchestral score."

In The Irish Times, Donald Clark praised the cinematography as "exquisite," but suggested that Lawrence's performance was "genuinely poor." He concluded, "Nobody is likely to see the [film]." Writing for The Independent, Geoffrey Macnab called it "a strangely dour and downbeat affair." He suggested it was reminiscent of Michael Cimino's Heaven's Gate. However, he criticized its "heavy-handed poetic symbolism" and "the guilt and self-loathing that its characters feel."

References

External links
 
 
 
 

2014 films
2014 drama films
American drama films
English-language French films
French drama films
2010s English-language films
Films directed by Susanne Bier
Films based on American novels
Films set in North Carolina
Films shot in the Czech Republic
Films set in 1929
Films set in the 1930s
2010s American films
2010s French films